Ragnar Mattson (5 January 1892 – 5 December 1965), also Bernlöf, was a Swedish athlete who competed in the 1912 Summer Olympics. In 1912 he finished 23rd in the high jump competition.

References

External links
 profile

1892 births
1965 deaths
Swedish male high jumpers
Olympic athletes of Sweden
Athletes (track and field) at the 1912 Summer Olympics